John Hill (born 11 November 1956) is an Australian cricketer. He played in seven first-class matches for Queensland in 1986/87.

See also
 List of Queensland first-class cricketers

References

External links
 

1956 births
Living people
Australian cricketers
Queensland cricketers
Cricketers from Newcastle, New South Wales